Huachupampa District is one of thirty-two districts of the province Huarochirí in Peru.

See also
 Antaqucha

References